Boothia may refer to:

 The Boothia Peninsula, a peninsula in Nunavut, Canada
 The Gulf of Boothia, a body of water in Nunavut, Canada